Freddie Elizalde (born 17 August 1940) is a Filipino former swimmer. He competed in two events at the 1960 Summer Olympics.

References

1940 births
Living people
Filipino male swimmers
Olympic swimmers of the Philippines
Swimmers at the 1960 Summer Olympics
People from Makati
Asian Games medalists in swimming
Asian Games silver medalists for the Philippines
Asian Games bronze medalists for the Philippines
Swimmers at the 1958 Asian Games
Medalists at the 1958 Asian Games
20th-century Filipino people
21st-century Filipino people